Philotoceraeus is a genus of beetles in the family Cerambycidae, containing the following species:

 Philotoceraeus descarpentriesi Breuning, 1975
 Philotoceraeus visendus Fairmaire, 1896

References

Agapanthiini